Roderich Ferdinand Ottomar Menzel (13 April 1907 – 17 October 1987) was a Czech-German amateur tennis player and, after his active career, a writer.

Birth
Roderich Menzel was born in Reichenberg in Bohemia (today Liberec in the Czech Republic). He lived with his parents and two brothers in a three-storey house in Römheldstraße 7 (Tatranská street these days). His father Ernst, who was born in the family of glassworks manager in the mountain village Wilhelmshöhe, rose from a correspondent to the position of a partner of cable manufacturer Felten & Guilleaume's North Bohemia office.

During his studies at a business high school he started to playing a football as a goalkeeper for RSK Reichenberg – at the age of 16 (1923) he joined the senior team. Looking back on his goalkeeper career Menzel often gave a good funny story about his great idol, goalkeeper of RSK Reichenberg, Ende. As is usual, home team goalkeeper's name always appeared at the very end of both team rosters in the home programme but in this case people often thought that at that point the programme actually ends.

But as he was playing tennis at same level as a football, an important decision had to be made. He chose tennis and soon became a Czechoslovak junior champion (1925). Shortly before he had to cope with a large family tragedy, when his father died of a heart attack due to complicated double pneumonia.

Tennis career
In 1928, Menzel first qualified for the main Wimbledon competition and also entered a Davis cup competition against Sweden. He immediately won his first two singles in his long successful Davis Cup career (61 wins/23 defeats), which in a history of the Czech (Czechoslovakian) Davis Cup team remains unsurpassed. Among his memorable Davis Cup performances belongs a couple of five set battles against Gottfried Von Cramm, his great rival at the time.

Menzel also collected his trophies at other tournaments. In 1931, he won one of the most prestigious tournaments at the time, the German Open Tennis Championships, over Gustav Jaenecke and Monte-Carlo Masters just one year later, over George Rogers. Only few weeks later he achieved his big first Grand Slam result when he made it to the French Championships semifinals, where he lost to Giorgio de Stefani. His excellent form continued as he won over von Cramm in the semifinal and Jacques Brugnon in the final of the Rot-Weiß Club tournament in Berlin.

His stable form Menzel also confirmed one year later, in 1933, when he was playing quarterfinals at the French Championships and Wimbledon. He reached the same result in 1934, narrowly losing against von Cramm at the French Championships and, in one of the most memorable matches of all time, to Fred Perry at Wimbledon. Things got better at the Czechoslovakian International Championships (against von Cramm) and Egypt International (against Pat Hughes), which he both won. What is more, he triumphed at the tournament in Cairo in following four years in a row. In 1934 he and Ladislav Hecht won the Butler Trophy of Monte Carlo, defeating Jacques Brugnon and Jean Lesueur in the final. A. Wallis Myers of The Daily Telegraph ranked Menzel as the World No. 7 for 1934.

There was no exception in 1935, when Menzel again finished his participation in Grand Slam tournaments in the quarter-finals, at the US Championships even in the fourth round. But at the same place he teamed up with Kay Stammers to be the Mixed Doubles runner-up, losing in the finals to Sarah Palfrey / Enrique Maier. A major achievement was reaching the final at the Pacific Southwest Tournament in Los Angeles same year, where he was beaten by Don Budge. But it was for long time Menzel's latest success. In 1936, he suffered couple of breakdowns which resulted in serious heart problems. For more than a year he was forced to reconvalesce. He spent nearly one year in Bad Gräfenberg (now Lázně Jeseník) where he received most of the treatments.

The first symptoms of Menzel's health problems appeared in the quarter-finals of the French Championships, when he played against Bunny Austin, No. 2-ranked player in the world that time. He was leading 2–1 in sets but, while changing sides, he made a mistake and took a sip from his opponent's glass. To his unpleasant surprise, it was a gin instead of water. Vision problems and hallucinations immediately followed and Menzel lost the match. He did not pay too much attention to it until the Davis Cup final a few weeks later, when he played a crucial match of the whole series against von Cramm. The famous German already had two match points in the fourth set, but Menzel managed to avert the threat and won the set 7–5 to tie the match at 2–2. After Menzel won the first game of the fifth set and von Cramm continued to suffer, he received a strange offer at his home bench while changing sides. 'It will strengthen you' said President of the Czech Tennis Association and handed Menzel a glass of champagne! Menzel still managed to nearly win the second game of the fifth set, but once he started to see blurry sidelines, he knew that it was over. He lost the final set 1–6.

Menzel was back in 1937, but his early defeat at Wimbledon (first round) suggests that his comeback would not be that easy. A much better situation was in the doubles, where he managed (with Ladislav Hecht) to get into the semi-finals. Everything was forgiven one year later, when Menzel was the men's singles runner-up at the French Open, losing in the final against Budge. His biggest success of all time was a little bit reduced by an absence of great players such as von Cramm or Perry.

In September 1938, on the basis of the Munich Agreement, it was decided that Czechoslovakia had to lose a part of its territory (Sudetenland) to Nazi Germany. Menzel, who was born and spent his childhood in Reichenberg, now the capital of a new German state, became also a German citizen. In May 1939, only a few months later, he already played for his new homeland, Germany, in the Davis Cup. After the outbreak of World War II, Menzel started working as a journalist in a foreign broadcast of Großdeutscher Rundfunk. Unlike his other colleagues in the team (Henner Henkel was killed at Battle of Stalingrad, von Cramm was wounded on the Eastern Front) Menzel didn't have to go to the front, and spent the war years in the relative safety of Berlin (he lived in the Bavarian Quarter, Güntzelstraße 4). After the war, Menzel tried to build on his pre-war tennis achievements, but with the exception of a few victories in tournaments of only regional significance, his career came to an end.

Roderich Menzel had at that time an unusually tall physique (6 ft 3in), which directly predetermined him to a serve and volley style of play. He was also notorious for his fierce temper – he refused to play until the nearby bells stopped ringing or a child stopped crying in the stands. Menzel also loved often to passionately „discuss" with the judge and spectators. The spectators at the stadium of the Italian tennis championships in Rome annoyed him to such an extent that he went off the court and never came back. Although Menzel failed to win any Grand Slam tournaments, his achievements in the Davis Cup and at the most prestigious international tournaments rank him among the world tennis elite of the time.

Travel
There was yet another addition to Menzel's passions – travel. He was often, as he states, in a good mood, when he was eliminated from some tournament, because he had more time to explore the surrounding beauty. And when he saw something extraordinary, he often had to think about it during the next match.

Africa certainly belonged among his favourite parts of the world, not only because of his five consecutive wins in a row at International Championships in Cairo. It was particularly in Egypt that he felt at home. Cairo, pyramids, Alexandria, Luxor, Nile, Assuan – all these places made every time a huge impression on him. He often also recalled the meeting with many interesting people, such as Sheikh Mussa, King of snakes.

Menzel also visited Australia several times, sometimes with mixed feelings. It certainly had something to do with a conflict that happened during one doubles match, when the audience didn't want to allow the players to leave the court, even though it was becoming dark; "Play on – we paid" they shouted. However, this conflict didn't prevent Menzel from going all around Australia and subsequently the entire Pacific region (Samoa, Tahiti, Hawaii).

In the summer of 1935 Menzel came to India – Kolkata, Mumbai, elephants ride, expedition into the jungle, meeting with the Maharajah of Mysore. Especially the latter area charmed him quite a lot – "Mysore has two skies – one above me and the other beneath me!". Menzel's next steps led to Ceylon and Japan. He visited Hong Kong and Singapore on the way back.

With tennis Menzel was able to travel all around a world completely different from the one we know today, at the very end of the so-called colonial era. “Many things have changed since my travels,” writes Menzel in his autobiography Liebe zu Böhmen.

Literary career
Already when Roderich Menzel was at the peak of his athletic career, he contributed as a journalist to many newspapers and magazines. His articles were not only about sport, he also wrote about numerous experiences from his travels around the world.

Before World War II, Menzel mostly contributed to Prager Tagblatt, where his colleagues were such names as Egon Erwin Kisch or Max Brod. Menzel didn't write only to the daily sports column, he also composed poems and It is definitely worth noting that Menzel alternated for two years with Hermann Hesse and Karel Čapek in Saturday's feuilleton column of Prager Tagblatt. Apart from this major Prague German newspaper Menzel also wrote to BZ am Mittag and Vossische Zeitung. In 1931, he published his first sports novel Der weiße Weg, which was also published in Zurich daily Sport and came out in Czech translation under title Bílá cesta one year later. Soon followed by other titles, mostly from the tennis environment – Tennis… wie ich sehe!, Tennis-Parade or Geliebte Tennispartnerin. But he was able to fully focus on his writing passion to the end of his athletic career.

In his new home, Bavarian Landshut, Menzel wrote books not only about his most favourite sports (tennis and football), but he also began to wonder about the other genres. Great success was the medical book Triumph der Medizin, which earned admiration even among the professional community (it was included in the compulsory literature of medical universities in Japan). Meanwhile, he moved to Munich, where he started to work as head of feuilleton department in a newspaper Echo der Woche. Menzel met there his future wife, illustrator Johanna Sengler, who gave him an idea to start writing books for children.

Since the early 60's he published (some under the pseudonym Clemens Parma) number of books for the youngest readers – fairy tales, poems and legends, often from his native land. Märchenreise ins Sudetenland, Neue Rüberzahl-Geschichten or Schlesische Märchen. Most of his books for children were illustrated by his new wife – Pitt und das verzauberte Fahrrad, Zotti der Bär or Der fliegende Teppich. In 1963, Menzel won the 1st Prize in the best children's book competition, organized by the Federal Ministry for Displaced Persons, Refugees and War Victims, for his book Die Buben am Hammersee. Menzel also proved his creative talent in radio, television and theater. In 1950 he won, together with Josef Mühlberger, a competition of Adalbert Stifter Association for the best drama. Menzel's theater play Rüberzahl, conducted by Schauspiel Studio Iserlohn, was played in 43 German cities.

Menzel's memories had fully come to life in his work from 1970's. First in his autobiography Liebe zu Böhmen, and then in the Die Tannhofs trilogy (1974–1981), the highlight of his work. In these books Menzel describes abrupt changes of Central Europe during the 20th century on the background of one family. He also fully confessed his admiration for the Austro-Hungarian Empire there. After completion of the trilogy in the early 1980s Menzel concluded his work with the sports topics again and wrote profiles of the leading German footballers: Die Großen des Sports: Toni Schumacher or Die Großen des Sports: Karl-Heinz Förster.

Bibliography

Verse
Zwischen Mensch und Gott (1937)
Lied am Brunnenrand (1953)

Novels
Ein Mann, wie neugeboren (1942)
Die Männer sind so wankelmütig (1958)
Die Tannhoffs 1: Als Böhmen noch bei Österreich war (1974)
Die Tannhoffs 2: Der Pulverturm (1977)
Die Tannhoffs 3: Die Sieger (1981)

History books
Wunder geschehen jeden Tag (1955)
Ein Herz für das Volk (1956)
Sie haben die Welt verzaubert (1967)
Liebe zu Böhmen (1973)

Travel books
Unglaublich, aber wahr! (1940)
Abenteuer, Geheimnis und große Fahrt (1953)
Ruhm war ihr Begleiter (1964)
Adam schuf die Erde neu (1968)

Children's books
Vom Jungen, der die Zeit verstellte (1959)
Tischlein deck dich, Esel streck dich, Knüppel aus dem Sack (1960)
Abenteuer auf Sizilien (1960)
Der Rattenfänger von Hameln (1961)
Hänsel und Gretel (1961)
Till Eulenspiegel (1962)
Pitt und das verzauberte Fahrrad (1963)
Im Land der Perlentaucher (1963)
Der wandernde Schuh (1963)
Ruhm war ihr Begleiter (1964)
Das Wunderauto (1964)
Geheimer Treffpunkt: Waldhütte (1964)
Schneewittchen (1964)
Wie Kasperle die Prinzessin bekam (1965)
Wie Tom den Krieg abschaffte (1966)
Leo der Löwe (1966)
Kitti, das Kätzchen (1966)
Juri das Zauberpony (1966)
Zotti der Bär (1966)
Mario und Grissi (1967)
Märchenreise ins Sudetenland (1967)
Der fliegende Teppich (1968)
Thomas, grosser Fussballheld (1968)
Peter und die Turmuhr (1968)
Sabu spielt die Hirtenflöte (1968)
Der Vogelkönig (1970)
Stärker als 1000 Pferde (1972)
Neue Rübezahl-Geschichten (1973)
Lockende Ferne (1974)
Geheimversteck Burgruine (1977)
Den Schmugglern auf der Spur (1977)
Österreichische Märchen (1978)

Schlesische Märchen (1979)
Wo die Kinder wohnen (1981)
Tills abenteuerliche Ferien (1981)
Zwei Junge Detektive (1982)
Die schönsten Märchen (1987)

Sports books
Tennis ... wie ich es sehe! (1932)
Tennis-Parade (1937)
Geliebte Tennispartnerin (1940)
Weltmacht Tennis (1951)
Deutsches Tennis (1955)
Tennis für dich und mich (1957)
Tennislehrgang (1963)
Weltmeister auf dem Eis: Kilius/Bäumler (1963)
Mein Fussball und ich (1964)
Spiel, Kampf, Sieg (1965)
Sportregeln, die jeder kennen sollte (1966)
Meine Freunde, die Weltmeister (1966)
Die besten elf Skiläufer (1972)
Männer gegen Eis und Wüste (1974)
Die besten elf Fussballstars (1974)
Die besten elf Fussballer (1976)
Die besten elf Tennismeister (1977)
Die besten elf Torjäger (1977)
Die besten Fussballstars (1980)
Goldmann-Tennis-Lexikon (1980)
Elf berühmte Fußballer (1980)
Die neuen Fussballgrössen (1981)
Elf berühmte Fussballer (1981)
Fussball – Fussball: Spieler, Trainer, Meisterschaften (1982)
Berühmte Fussballstars und ihre Trainer, Manager und Fans (1983)
Die jungen Fussball-Löwen (1985)
Von As bis Aus (1986)

Biographies
Max Reinhardt (1959)
Die Großen des Sports: Sepp Maier (1980)
Die Großen des Sports: Luis Trenker (1982)
Die Großen des Sports: Paul Breitner (1982)
Die Großen des Sports: Toni Schumacher (1983)
Die Großen des Sports: Karl-Heinz Rummenigge (1983)
Die Großen des Sports: Karl-Heinz Förster (1983)
Die Großen des Sports: Pierre Littbarski (1983)
Die Großen des Sports: Reinhold Messner (1983)
Reinhold Messner. Bergsteiger und Abenteurer (1987)

Medical books
Triumph der Medizin (1950)
Männer, die den Krebs bekämpfen (1953)
Rettung für Millionen (1956)

Scientific books
Die Herren von morgen (1963)
Bis ans Ende der Welt (1971)
7 x 7 Weltwunder (1972)

Marriages
Roderich Menzel married:

Anna Maria ‘Bucky’ Rabl (1908–1953), an enthusiastic tennis player and downhill skier (she was born in Innsbruck), often accompanied Menzel on his trips around the world. They married on 11 February 1931 in Innsbruck. She later married Josef, Baron von Colloredo-Mansfeld. Her daughter, Kristina Colloredo-Mansfeld is the owner of the Opočno Castle in the Czech Republic. They divorced in 1937.
Erika Franziska Josefa Wurdinger (1914), had a tragic personal experience with the expulsion of Germans from Czechoslovakia after World War II – her father was murdered. They married on 18 January 1938 in Saaz an der Eger. They have two sons: Michael and Christian.
Gerda ?. They have two daughters: Renate and Carola.
Johanna Sengler (1924), an illustrator and graphic artist, exhibited her work worldwide (e.g. USA, Srí Lanka, Netherlands, Switzerland). In 1972, she founded an art school for children, later also for adult. They married on 12 December 1952 and divorced in 1970. They have one son: Peter.

Death
In spring 1983, Menzel was injured in an automobile accident from which he never fully recovered. He died on 17 October 1987 in hospital in Munich-Pasing, Germany, aged 80.

Grand Slam finals

Singles (1 runner-up)

Mixed doubles (1 runner-up)

Performance timeline

Career finals

Davis Cup

For Czechoslovakia

For Germany

References

External links
 
 
 
 

Sudeten German people
Czechoslovak male tennis players
German male tennis players
Sportspeople from Liberec
1907 births
1987 deaths